Association football – commonly known as football (or soccer in the United States and Canada) – is a popular sport in the British Virgin Islands.  The British Virgin Islands Football Association – the territory's football governing body – organizes the men's and women's national teams and administers the territory's professional league the BVIFA National Football League.  As members of Caribbean Football Union teams are eligible for the Caribbean Club Championship and the territory's membership in CONCACAF allows teams to participate in that organizations club and national team competitions. The British Virgin Island are also a member of FIFA and is therefore eligible to play in the World Cup.  The national teams also compete in the Virgin Islands Championship against the US Virgin Islands.

History
The British Virgin Islands Football Association was founded and became full members of CONCACAF and FIFA in 1974.  The Association traces formal football to a three team league formed by Royal Engineers and expatriates who were expanding Beef Island Airport.  The men's national team won the Leeward Islands Tournament in 1986.

League system
The territory's association administers the highest competitive football league in the British Virgin Islands, the BVIFA National Football League.  The league was founded in 2009 after the merger between the leagues of the territory's two most populous islands, the Tortola League and the Virgin Gorda League.  The league's most successful team is Islanders FC with eight league championships.  In 2012 the league decided to split the teams into two groups, based on the position they finished in the standings at the end of the 2011-12 season.

Football stadiums on the Virgin Islands

References

Football in the British Virgin Islands